Sony Ericsson Z800i is a 3G mobile phone developed by Sony Ericsson and released in 2005. The Z800i is a phone that is identical to the Vodafone branded Sony Ericsson V800 (or 802SE in Japan).

It is a 3G and Tri-band phone weighing 128 grams. It has a 1.3-megapixel rotating camera (that can rotate 180 degrees, called the MotionEye camera), that lets you take photos, video and use it during Video Calls.

It is a quite well featured, for its time, 3G phone that supports WAP 2.0, UMTS (or the slower GPRS), polyphonic ringtones in MIDI up to 72 tones, and Java applications. You can store multimedia files in its internal memory (5 MBs) or in a Memory Stick PRO Duo card.

Features
 Camera1.3-megapixel resolution (1280 x 960 pixels) with 16x digital zoom and photo light
 MultimediaAudio playback - AAC, AMR, MP3, MIDI, WAV, WMV, XMF and TruetoneVideo playback - MP4, DiVX, 3GPMusic and Video Streaming is available
 JavaVersion: MIDP 2.0BrowsingWAP 2.0, XHTML/HTML multimode browser
 Battery performanceStandby time: 140 hoursVoice Talk time: 150 minVideo Talk time: 85 min

See also
 Sony Ericsson V800

External links
 Sony Ericsson Home Page

Z800i
Mobile phones introduced in 2005
Mobile phones with infrared transmitter